The 1989 Seoul Open was a men's tennis tournament played on outdoor hard courts at the Seoul Olympic Park Tennis Center in Seoul in South Korea that was part of the 1989 Nabisco Grand Prix circuit. The tournament was held from April 10 through April 17, 1989. Unseeded Robert Van't Hof won the singles title.

Finals

Singles

 Robert Van't Hof defeated  Brad Drewett 7–5, 6–4
 It was Van't Hof's only title of the year and the 6th of his career.

Doubles

 Scott Davis /  Paul Wekesa defeated  John Letts /  Bruce Man-Son-Hing 6–2, 6–4
 It was Davis' 1st title of the year and the 10th of his career. It was Wekesa's only title of the year and the 2nd of his career.

References

External links
 ITF tournament edition details